The Old Freiburg to Teplitz Post Road is one of the passes over the Ore Mountains and was a major transport link from the mining town of Freiberg (Saxony) over the crest of the Eastern Ore Mountains to the North Bohemian spa resort of Teplitz, now Teplice.

Literature 
 Balder Preuß/Jörg Brückner: Zum Verlauf der kursächsischen Poststraße von Freiberg nach Teplitz. In: Mitteilungen des Freiberger Altertumsvereins, 78. Heft, Freiberg in Sachsen, 1997, p. 32-43.
 Balder Preuß/Jörg Brückner: Wie verlief die kursächsische Poststraße von Freiberg nach Teplitz? In: Erzgeb. Heimatblätter 19 (1997), H. 3, p. 5-9.
 Balder Preuß/Jörg Brückner: Spurensuche: Die alte Poststraße zwischen Freiberg und Teplitz. In: Jahrbuch der Region Freiberg 1998, p. 174 ff.

Czech geographic history
History of the Ore Mountains
Transport in the Ore Mountains
Freiberg
Medieval roads and tracks
Historic trails and roads in Germany